Bhutan participated in the 2016 South Asian Games in Guwahati and Shillong, Bhutan from 5 February to 16 February 2016.

Medal summary
Bhutan won 1 silver and 15 bronze medals.

Medal table

References

Nations at the 2016 South Asian Games
Bhutan at the South Asian Games